The Slavic antithesis is a stylistic device used in Serbian, Croatian, Bosnian,  and Macedonian epic poetry. It is usually implemented at the beginning of the poem and consists of three parts: a question is asked, then a negative answer is given, and finally the real explanation is provided. The first two parts of the Slavic antithesis are usually similar, while the last verse (the explanation) differs. The first two parts (a question and a negative answer) are descriptive and are simply there to increase the power of the third part (the explanation). Many poems use the same descriptive lines while only changing the last line.

Example
This is an example of the Slavic antithesis from the beginning of the Bosnian ballad "Hasanaginica":

The final line is explanatory and supported by the previous descriptive lines, which give it impact on the audience.

The Slavic Antithesis is also exemplified by one of western pop culture's most iconic lines: "Is it a bird? Is it a plane? No...It's SUPERMAN!"

References

Sims‐Williams, Patrick (2010). "Irish Influence on Medieval Welsh Literature". Oxford University Press.

See also
Serbian epic poetry

Poetic forms
South Slavic culture
Serbian epic poetry